Ma Miaolan (born January 18, 1970) is a retired Chinese heptathlete. On August 9, 1993 in Beijing, she set the Chinese record with a score of 6750 points. Her achievements in sport earned her the nickname "Asia's Iron Woman" (亚洲女铁人). A native of Dongyang, Zhejiang, after her retirement she married table tennis athlete Chen Jian (陈健). , the couple lived in Jinhua, and have one son (born c. 1994).

Achievements

References

1970 births
Living people
Chinese heptathletes
Sportspeople from Hangzhou
Asian Games medalists in athletics (track and field)
Athletes from Zhejiang
Athletes (track and field) at the 1990 Asian Games
Asian Games gold medalists for China
Medalists at the 1990 Asian Games
20th-century Chinese women